Megalastrum is a genus of ferns in the family Dryopteridaceae, subfamily Elaphoglossoideae, in the Pteridophyte Phylogeny Group classification of 2016 (PPG I). The genus has around 100 species, mainly found in tropical America and Africa.

Taxonomy
The genus name Megalastrum was first published by Richard Holttum in 1987.

Species
, Plants of the World Online recognized the following species:

Megalastrum abundans (Rosenst.) A.R.Sm. & R.C.Moran
Megalastrum acrosorum (Hieron.) A.R.Sm. & R.C.Moran
Megalastrum adenopteris (C.Chr.) A.R.Sm. & R.C.Moran
Megalastrum aequatoriense A.Rojas
Megalastrum albidum R.C.Moran, J.Prado & Labiak
Megalastrum alticola M.Kessler & A.R.Sm.
Megalastrum andicola (C.Chr.) A.R.Sm. & R.C.Moran
Megalastrum angustum R.C.Moran, J.Prado & Labiak
Megalastrum apicale R.C.Moran & J.Prado
Megalastrum aquilinum (Thouars) Sundue, Rouhan & R.C.Moran
Megalastrum aripense (C.Chr. & Maxon) A.R.Sm. & R.C.Moran
Megalastrum atrogriseum (C.Chr.) A.R.Sm. & R.C.Moran
Megalastrum aureisquama M.Kessler & A.R.Sm.
Megalastrum biseriale (Baker) A.R.Sm. & R.C.Moran
Megalastrum bolivianum M.Kessler & A.R.Sm.
Megalastrum brevipubens R.C.Moran, J.Prado & Labiak
Megalastrum canescens (Mett.) A.R.Sm. & R.C.Moran
Megalastrum caribaeum (Desv.) R.C.Moran, J.Prado & Labiak
Megalastrum ciliatum M.Kessler & A.R.Sm.
Megalastrum clathratum R.C.Moran, J.Prado & Sundue
Megalastrum connexum (Kaulf.) A.R.Sm. & R.C.Moran
Megalastrum costipubens R.C.Moran & J.Prado
Megalastrum crenulans (Fée) A.R.Sm. & R.C.Moran
Megalastrum ctenitoides A.Rojas
Megalastrum decompositum R.C.Moran, J.Prado & Sundue
Megalastrum dentatum A.Rojas
Megalastrum eugenii (Brade) A.R.Sm. & R.C.Moran
Megalastrum exaggeratum (Baker) Holttum
Megalastrum falcatum A.Rojas
Megalastrum fibrillosum (Baker) R.C.Moran, J.Prado & Sundue
Megalastrum fimbriatum R.C.Moran, J.Prado & Sundue
Megalastrum fugaceum R.C.Moran, J.Prado & Sundue
Megalastrum galapagense R.C.Moran, J.Prado & Sundue
Megalastrum galeottii (M.Martens) R.C.Moran & J.Prado
Megalastrum gilbertii (Clute) R.C.Moran, J.Prado & Labiak
Megalastrum glabrius (C.Chr. & Skottsb.) Sundue, Rouhan & R.C.Moran
Megalastrum glabrum R.C.Moran & J.Prado
Megalastrum gompholepis R.C.Moran & J.Prado
Megalastrum grande (C.Presl) A.R.Sm. & R.C.Moran
Megalastrum haitiense (Brause) A.R.Sm. & R.C.Moran
Megalastrum heydei (C.Chr.) R.C.Moran & J.Prado
Megalastrum hirsutosetosum (Hieron.) A.R.Sm. & R.C.Moran
Megalastrum honestum (Kunze) A.R.Sm. & R.C.Moran
Megalastrum inaequale (Link) A.R.Sm. & R.C.Moran
Megalastrum inaequalifolium (Colla) A.R.Sm. & R.C.Moran
Megalastrum indusiatum R.C.Moran, J.Prado & Labiak
Megalastrum insigne R.C.Moran, J.Prado & Sundue
Megalastrum intermedium R.C.Moran & J.Prado
Megalastrum kallooi (Jermy & T.G.Walker) A.R.Sm. & R.C.Moran
Megalastrum lanatum (Fée) Holttum
Megalastrum lanuginosum (Kaulf.) Holttum
Megalastrum lasiernos (Spreng.) A.R.Sm. & R.C.Moran
Megalastrum littorale R.C.Moran, J.Prado & Labiak
Megalastrum longiglandulosum R.C.Moran & J.Prado
Megalastrum longipilosum A.Rojas
Megalastrum lunense (Christ) A.R.Sm. & R.C.Moran
Megalastrum macrotheca (Fée) A.R.Sm. & R.C.Moran
Megalastrum magnum (Baker) Holttum
Megalastrum marginatum M.Kessler & A.R.Sm.
Megalastrum martinicense (Spreng.) R.C.Moran, J.Prado & Labiak
Megalastrum masafuerae Sundue, Rouhan & R.C.Moran
Megalastrum mexicanum R.C.Moran & J.Prado
Megalastrum microsorum (Kuntze) Stolze
Megalastrum miscellum R.C.Moran, J.Prado & Sundue
Megalastrum molle A.R.Sm.
Megalastrum mollicomum (C.Chr.) A.R.Sm. & R.C.Moran
Megalastrum nanum R.C.Moran, J.Prado & Sundue
Megalastrum nigromarginatum R.C.Moran, J.Prado & Sundue
Megalastrum obtusum R.C.Moran, J.Prado & Sundue
Megalastrum oellgaardii R.C.Moran, J.Prado & Sundue
Megalastrum oppositum (Kaulf. ex Spreng.) Li Bing Zhang & Yi F.Duan
Megalastrum oreocharis (Sehnem) Salino & Ponce
Megalastrum oreophilum R.C.Moran, J.Prado & Sundue
Megalastrum organense R.C.Moran, J.Prado & Labiak
Megalastrum palmense (Rosenst.) A.R.Sm. & R.C.Moran
Megalastrum peregrinum Sundue, Rouhan & R.C.Moran
Megalastrum peruvianum R.C.Moran, J.Prado & Sundue
Megalastrum platylobum (Baker) A.R.Sm. & R.C.Moran
Megalastrum pleiosoros (Hook.f.) A.R.Sm. & R.C.Moran
Megalastrum polybotryoides R.C.Moran, J.Prado & Sundue
Megalastrum praetermissum R.C.Moran, J.Prado & Sundue
Megalastrum pubescens A.Rojas
Megalastrum pubirhachis R.C.Moran, J.Prado & Sundue
Megalastrum pulverulentum (Poir.) A.R.Sm. & R.C.Moran
Megalastrum reductum A.Rojas
Megalastrum retrorsum R.C.Moran, J.Prado & Labiak
Megalastrum rhachisquamatum R.C.Moran, J.Prado & Sundue
Megalastrum rupicola M.Kessler & A.R.Sm.
Megalastrum skutchii (Lellinger) A.R.Sm. & R.C.Moran
Megalastrum sparsipilosum R.C.Moran & J.Prado
Megalastrum spectabile (Kaulf.) A.R.Sm. & R.C.Moran
Megalastrum squamosissimum (Sodiro) A.R.Sm. & R.C.Moran
Megalastrum subincisum (Willd.) A.R.Sm. & R.C.Moran
Megalastrum substrigosum R.C.Moran, J.Prado & Labiak
Megalastrum subtile R.C.Moran, J.Prado & Sundue
Megalastrum taafense Rouhan, Sundue & R.C.Moran
Megalastrum tepuiense R.C.Moran, J.Prado & Sundue
Megalastrum umbrinum (C.Chr.) A.R.Sm. & R.C.Moran
Megalastrum vastum (Kunze) A.R.Sm. & R.C.Moran
Megalastrum villosulum (C.Chr.) A.R.Sm. & R.C.Moran
Megalastrum villosum (L.) Holttum
Megalastrum wacketii (C.Chr.) A.R.Sm. & R.C.Moran
Megalastrum yungense (C.Chr. & Rosenst.) A.R.Sm. & R.C.Moran

References

Dryopteridaceae
Fern genera